Isabelle Carré (born 28 May 1971) is a French actress. She has appeared in more than 70 films since 1989. She won a César Award for Best Actress for her role in Se souvenir des belles choses (2001), and has been nominated a further six times for Beau fixe (1992), Le Hussard sur le toit (1995), La Femme défendue (1997), Les Sentiments (2003), Entre ses mains (2005) and Anna M. (2007).

Since 26 August 2006, she has been married to film producer Bruno Pésery, with whom she has a son, Antoine, born on 11 October 2008. Her brother, Benoît Carré, is a member of the band Lilicub.

Selected filmography

Theatre
 1990: Une nuit de Casanova
 1990: The Cherry Orchard
 1992: L'École des Femmes
 1993: On ne badine pas avec l'amour
 1993: Il ne faut jurer de rien
 1993: Le Mal court
 1995: Dostoïevsky va à la plage
 1995: Le Père humilié
 1995: Arloc
 1996: Slaves
 1999: Mademoiselle Else
 2000: Résonances
 2001: The Tragedy of Othello, the Moor of Venice
 2001: Léonce et Léna
 2002: Hugo à deux voix
 2003: La Nuit chante
 2004: L'Hiver sous la table
 2006: Blanc
 2009: Un garçon impossible (by Petter S. Rosenlund, directed by Jean-Michel Ribes)

Awards
 Prix Romy Schneider, 1998
 Lumières Award for Best Actress, Se souvenir des belles choses, 2003
 César Award for Best Actress, Se souvenir des belles choses, 2003

Nominations
 1993: Nominated for the César Award for Most Promising Actress for Beau fixe
 1996: Nominated for the César Award for Most Promising Actress for Le Hussard sur le toit
 1998: Nominated for the César Award for Most Promising Actress for La Femme défendue
 2004: Nominated for the César Award for Best Actress for Les Sentiments
 2006: Nominated for the César Award for Best Actress for Entre ses mains (In His Hands)
 2006: Nominated for the Globes de Cristal Award for Best Actress for Entre ses mains (In His Hands)
 2008: Nominated for the César Award for Best Actress for Anna M.
 2008: Nominated for the Globes de Cristal Award for Best Actress for Anna M.
 2011: Nominated for the César Award for Best Actress for Les Émotifs anonymes

Theatre
 1999: Molière Award for Best Actress, Mademoiselle Else
 2004: Molière Award for Best Actress, L'Hiver sous la table

Decorations
 Officer of the Order of Arts and Letters (2016)

References

External links

Isabelle Carré at Actricesdefrance.org

1971 births
Living people
Actresses from Paris
French film actresses
French stage actresses
Best Actress César Award winners
Best Actress Lumières Award winners
20th-century French actresses
21st-century French actresses
Cours Florent alumni
Officiers of the Ordre des Arts et des Lettres
Audiobook narrators